The 1924 Montana gubernatorial election took place on November 4, 1924. Incumbent Governor of Montana Joseph M. Dixon, who was first elected governor in 1920, ran for re-election. Dixon won a competitive Republican primary, and moved on to the general election, where he faced John E. Erickson, a former district court judge and the Democratic nominee; and Frank J. Edwards, the 1916 Republican nominee for governor and the Farmer–Labor Party nominee. Ultimately, Erickson managed to defeat Dixon in his bid for re-election, winning what would be the first of three terms as governor.

Democratic primary

Candidates
John E. Erickson, former Eleventh Judicial District Judge
Roy E. Ayers, former Associate Justice of the Supreme Court of Montana
Miles Romney Sr., former State Senator, former Mayor of Hamilton
I. G. Denny, former Missoula County Attorney
Sam J. Hampton

Results

Farmer–Labor Party primary

Candidates
Frank J. Edwards, 1916 Republican nominee for Governor of Montana

Results

Republican primary

Candidates
Joseph M. Dixon, incumbent Governor of Montana
Lee Dennis, former Chairman of the Montana Railroad and Public Service Commission

Results

General election

Results

References

Montana
Gubernatorial
1924
November 1924 events